Neodhysores is a genus of wrinkled bark beetles in the family Carabidae, found in Southeastern Brazil. Only three specimens of this genus are known to have been found, representing these two species:

 Neodhysores schreiberi (Vulcano & Pereira, 1975)
 Neodhysores seximpressus R.T. Bell & J.R. Bell, 1978

References

Rhysodinae